South Georgia Tormenta FC is an American soccer organization based in Statesboro, Georgia, United States. Founded in 2015, the club fields a professional team in USL League One, the third tier of the American Soccer Pyramid, as well as a pre-professional team in USL League Two called Tormenta FC 2 and a pre-professional team in USL W-League.  The team colors are midnight navy, sky blue, silver, and magenta. The team's crest shows an ibis.

History
South Georgia Tormenta FC was founded in 2015 making it Statesboro's first pro team in any sport in 60 years, since the Statesboro Pilots of baseball's Georgia State League folded in 1955. Owned by Tormenta FC LLC, the operations of the franchise are steered by Darin Van Tassell and Netra Van Tassell. The word "tormenta" means "storm" in Spanish.

2016
On May 21, 2016, Tormenta FC hosted its inaugural home match against the Carolina Dynamo in front of 3,105 fans.

Tormenta FC won their first match in club history on June 16, 2016 against the Charlotte Eagles in a 2–0 decision. The club then followed up that victory with a second consecutive win on June 18, 2016 by defeating the Carolina Dynamo 1–0. On June 23, 2016, Tormenta FC not only scored their first ever home goal, but the team managed to win their first home match as well; a 1–0 victory over Southern West Virginia King's Warriors.

Tormenta had a five-game win streak snapped in a 2–1 defeat against the King's Warriors on July 2, 2016.

The club finished 6th out of 8 in the South Atlantic Division.

2018
On January 25, 2018, South Georgia Tormenta FC was announced as the first founding member of USL League One for 2019. The team had an undefeated regular season in 2018, clinching the Deep South Division championship. Tormenta FC hosted the conference playoffs in Statesboro, Georgia.

2019 
On March 29, 2019, Tormenta FC hosted the inaugural match of USL League One, winning 1–0 against the Greenville Triumph and setting a new attendance record of 3,519. After a successful start to the season that saw the team in second place, a second-half downturn with 2 wins in their last 16 matches brought them down to 6th place and out of a playoff spot.

2020 
On September 16, 2020, Tormenta announced that it had promoted John Miglarese to Technical Director, and promote previous assistant coach and head coach of Tormenta 2, Ian Cameron, to head coach of the first team.

2021 
On June 8, 2021, Tormenta announced they will be fielding a women's side to compete in the new USL W League beginning in 2022.

2022 
In the off season, the club signed former Tottenham Hotspur F.C. and English youth international player Kazaiah Sterling.
The club finished the season in third place, qualifying for the first round of the USL League One playoffs. In the club's first ever playoff appearance, they defeated sixth seeded Charlotte Independence and then second seeded Greenville Triumph before winning the final match against Chattanooga Red Wolves SC by the score of 2-1.

Stadium
Tormenta FC currently plays at Optim Sports Medicine Field, a 5,300-seat soccer-specific stadium in Statesboro. They previously played at Eagle Field at Erk Russell Park on the campus of Georgia Southern University from 2016 to most of the 2022 season.

Sponsorship

Record

Year-by-year

1. Top Scorer includes statistics from league matches only.

Head coaches

 Includes Regular Season, Playoffs & U.S. Open Cup. Excludes friendlies.

Players and staff

Current roster

Technical staff

  Ian Cameron – Head Coach
  Jorge Gonzalez – Assistant Coach
  Jordan Melia – Assistant Coach
  Tom Morris – Assistant Coach

Front office

  Aaron Cranford – Senior Director, Business Operations
  Bryce Judy - Senior Director, Soccer Operations
  Drew DeJohn - Assistant Director, Soccer Operations
  Colt Carver - Team Operations
  Brennan Dooley - Team Operations
  Brian Evans - Coordinator, Digital Media & Events
  Anthony Olivo - Coordinator, Ticket Sales & Service
  Mariah Pate - Coordinator, Ticket Sales & Service
  Edwin Pintor – Coordinator, Public Relations & Engagement
  Lily Gibbons - Coordinator, Recruiting
  Lars Eckenrode – Coordinator, Special Projects
  Alex Wagner - Sales and Marketing
  John Schlieman - Senior VP, Corporate Partnerships

Tormenta FC 2

In January 2019, the team announced that it would continue to field a team in USL League Two while also playing professionally in USL League One. The team, Tormenta FC 2, continues to play in the Deep South Division and has won the conference once in 2019. During its inaugural season, the team won the Southern Conference for the first time in organization history.

The 2 team has also qualified for two U.S. Open Cup tournaments in 2019 and 2020, with the latter being cancelled and the tournament spot being transferred to 2021.

Honors
USL League One
Playoffs
Winners: 2022

USL League Two
Deep South Division Champion: 2018

Player honors

References

External links
Official website

 
Association football clubs established in 2015
USL League Two teams
Soccer clubs in Georgia (U.S. state)
2015 establishments in Georgia (U.S. state)
USL League One teams
Bulloch County, Georgia